Antonio Agliardi (4 September 1832 – 19 March 1915) was an Italian Roman Catholic Cardinal, archbishop, and papal diplomat.

Biography
Agliardi was born at  Cologno al Serio, in what is now the Province of Bergamo.

He studied theology and canon law, and after acting as parish priest in his native diocese for twelve years was sent by the pope to Canada as a bishop's chaplain. On his return he was appointed secretary to the Congregation of the Propaganda.

In 1884, he was created by Pope Leo XIII Archbishop of Caesarea in partibus and sent to India as an Apostolic Delegate to report on the establishment of the hierarchy there.

In 1887 he again visited India, to carry out the terms of the concordat arranged with Portugal. The same year he was appointed secretary of the Congregation super negotiis ecclesiae extraordinariis. In 1889 he became papal Apostolic Nuncio to Bavaria at Munich and in 1892 at Vienna. Allowing himself to be involved in the ecclesiastical disputes that divided Hungary in 1895, he was made the subject of formal complaint by the Hungarian government and in 1896 was recalled.

In the consistory of 1896 he was elevated to Cardinal-Priest of Santi Nereo e Achilleo. In 1899 he was made Cardinal Bishop of Albano. In 1903, he was named vice-chancellor of the Catholic Church, and became the Chancellor of the Apostolic Chancery in the Secretariat of State in 1908.

He died in Rome and was buried in Bergamo.

Episcopal lineage

Agliardi's episcopal lineage, or apostolic succession was:

 Cardinal Scipione Rebiba
 Cardinal Giulio Antonio Santorio
 Cardinal Girolamo Bernerio
 Archbishop Galeazzo Sanvitale
 Cardinal Ludovico Ludovisi
 Cardinal Luigi Caetani
 Cardinal Ulderico Carpegna
 Cardinal Paluzzo Paluzzi Altieri degli Albertoni
 Pope Benedict XIII
 Pope Benedict XIV
 Cardinal Enrico Enríquez
 Archbishop Manuel Quintano Bonifaz
 Cardinal Buenaventura Fernández de Córdoba Spínola
 Cardinal Giuseppe Doria Pamphili
 Pope Pius VIII
 Pope Pius IX
 Cardinal Alessandro Franchi
 Cardinal Giovanni Simeoni
 Cardinal Antonio Agliardi

Notes

References

External links
Catholic-Hierarchy.org 

 
 

 
 

1832 births
1915 deaths
Clergy from the Province of Bergamo
Apostolic Nuncios to Austria
20th-century Italian cardinals
Cardinal-bishops of Albano
Cartellverband members
19th-century Italian Roman Catholic archbishops
20th-century Italian Roman Catholic archbishops
Apostolic Nuncios to Bavaria
Cardinals created by Pope Leo XIII
Roman Catholic titular archbishops of Caesarea